Zeds Dead is a Canadian electronic music duo from Toronto, Canada, consisting of Dylan Mamid, also known as DC, and Zachary Rapp-Rovan, also known as Hooks. The duo rose to prominence releasing original music and remixes from 2009 to 2010 before becoming a staple on the international touring circuit thereafter. 

Today, they are known for their exploration of a diverse variety of genres that combine aspects of dubstep, UK garage, house, electro house, hip-hop, glitch, drum and bass, and more.

Career
Mamid and Rapp-Rovan were born and raised in Toronto, Canada. The duo were introduced through mutual friends in 2004 when DC asked Hooks to paint a graffiti mural in his garage. They quickly discovered a mutual love for hip-hop and at the same time were both starting to produce music. They began to collaborate under the moniker 'Mass Productions'.  The duo's name comes from a line in the Quentin Tarantino film Pulp Fiction.

Mass Productions (2006–2007)
In the summer of 2007 Mass Productions independently released their first and only official release. The album was heavily influenced by 1990s hip hop.
However, Mass Productions did not garner much attention outside of the local scene.

Formation of Zeds Dead (2009–2010)
DC and Hooks both began to take an interest in electronic music and began producing dance music under the name, Zeds Dead. The group initially found a niche audience on Myspace.

Zeds Dead self-released their first track together, "Journey of a Lifetime", for free. They played their first live set at The Social in Toronto on June 11, 2009.

Bassmentality (2009–2013)
In 2009, Zeds Dead founded a weekly party called Bassmentality in the basement of the Toronto bar, 751. The party was intended as a venue for new DJs to play, unrestricted by concert promoters. In the summer of 2010, Bassmentality moved from the basement of 751 and into Toronto's Wrongbar.

Bassmentality featured weekly performances from its founders, Zeds Dead and The Killabits, as well as rotating slots of local and international acts. Over the four years that the event existed, it hosted early performances from several now-acclaimed artists such as Skrillex, Borgore, Nero, Camo & Krooked, Bare Noize, and Bar 9, among others.

In 2011, Zeds Dead released the track "Bassmentality" with The Killabits, named after the event.

Early touring (2009–2010)
Zeds Dead began their first official North American tour in December 2010, playing over 40 shows in Canada and the United States. They made their European debut in June 2010 in the UK, playing a string of dates around the electronic music festival Gottwood in Wales. The Graveyard Tour in 2011 was the first tour of its scale for Zeds Dead. From September to December, the duo played over 50 dates across North America.

International touring and releases (2011–present)

Victor EP
The Victor EP was released in March 2012 on Mad Decent's Jeffree's label. The album was a collaboration between Zeds Dead and Toronto-based artist Omar LinX. It featured Omar's rap vocals over seven Zeds Dead tracks. DatPiff called the album "[a fusion between] nostalgic 90s sample-based hip hop [and] futuristic bass [with] cinematic soundscapes."

The music video for the single "You and I" was shot throughout North America during the Living Dead Tour and received over 13 million plays on YouTube.

The Living Dead EP
The Living Dead EP was released in July 2012 on Ultra Records and was the second collaborative album with Omar LinX released that year. A music video was released for the title track on July 12. The video featured actor Peter Greene who played the character Zed in Quentin Tarantino's Pulp Fiction, the film that inspired the duo's name.

Hot Sauce EP
The Hot Sauce EP was released in January 2013 on Diplo's Mad Decent label. The EP was noted as a breakout album for the group. The first single, "Demons", had a music video made directed by Benjamin Millepied, the dancer who choreographed Darren Aronofsky's 2010 film, Black Swan. The video reinterprets Michael Jackson's "Thriller". The single was also featured in the video game Saints Row IV, and the film Step Up: All In.

Zeds Dead received a cease and desist order from the hot sauce manufacturer Tabasco regarding the album's original artwork. Tabasco believed the artwork to be overly similar to their branding. Zeds Dead was subsequently forced to remove all original art and promotional videos for the album.

Somewhere Else EP
Zeds Dead released the Somewhere Else EP in July 2014 on Mad Decent. The album contains collaborations and features with Twin Shadow, D'Angelo Lacy, Omar LinX, Big Gigantic, Bright Lights, Sean Price, Perry Farrell, and Dirtyphonics. Somewhere Else charted on several Billboard charts upon release, including the Billboard 200.

Prior to its release, the single "Lost You" featuring Twin Shadow & D'Angelo Lacy was intentionally leaked online by Zeds Dead through a Craigslist missed connections ad in which users were sent a short clip of the video upon responding. In May 2015, the video for "Lost You" received an MMVA nomination for best EDM/Dance video and won the award for Best Post-Production.

2 Night Stand Tour
In 2015, Billboard exclusively announced Zeds Dead's 2 Night Stand Tour, and plans for a new album in 2016. The tour aimed to take the duo off the festival circuit and place them in historically significant venues in major North American cities for two nights each.

A portion of the proceeds from the 2 Night Stand tour went to benefit the Florida rehab clinic Recovery Unplugged.

On the Austin stop of the 2 Night Stand tour, Zeds Dead attached heart rate monitors to four fans during their set and analyzed the results. The test concluded that there was a clear rise in heart rate during the performance and a correlation of heart rate peaks during key points in the set.

Record label and debut album (2016-Present)

Deadbeats
On March 1, 2016, Zeds Dead announced they had launched their own record label, Deadbeats, alongside the release of a new track "Back Home" featuring Freddie Gibbs.

Northern Lights
On October 14, 2016, Zeds Dead released their debut full-length album Northern Lights through their label Deadbeats, and subsequently embarked on a tour of the same name. The album has a wide variety of features including Rivers Cuomo and Pusha T on "Too Young", and Diplo and Elliphant on "Blame".

Discography

Studio albums

Remix albums

Mixtapes

Extended plays

Singles
2009
 "Journey of a Lifetime" [Deadbeats]
 "Dark Side Dub" [Self-released]

2010
 "Wake Up" (with Omar Linx) [Self-released]
 "Here Comes the Boom" [Self-released]
 "White Satin" [Self-released]
 "Out for Blood" (featuring Omar Linx) [Self-released]
 "Rude Boy" [San City High]

2011
 "1975" [Self-released]
 "The Twilight Zone" [Self-released]
 "Coffee Break" [Self-released]
 "Bassmentality" (with The Killabits) [Zeds Dead Inc]
 "Ruckus the Jam" [Dim Mak]

2012
 "The Living Dead" (with Omar Linx) [Ultra Records]

2013
 "Ratchet" [Self-released]
 "By Your Side" [Self-released]
 "Jericho" (featuring Memorecks) [Self-released] 
 "Shut Up and Sing" (featuring Greta Svabo Bech) [Greta Svabo Bech Records]
 "Turn Around" (with Major Lazer featuring Elephant Man) [Self-released]

2014
 "Hadouken" [Self-released]
 "Loud" (with Hunter Siegel) [Self-released]
 "Lost You" (featuring Twin Shadow and D'Angelo Lacy) [Ultra Music]

2015
 "You Know" (with Oliver Heldens) [Spinnin' Records]
 "Collapse 2.0" (featuring Memorecks) [Mad Decent]
 "Wit Me Dub" (with Megalodon) [Zeds Dead Inc]
 "Flies" (with Loudpvck) [Mad Decent]
 "One Time" (featuring Murs) [Zeds Dead Inc]

2016
 "Back Home" (featuring Freddie Gibbs) [Deadbeats]
 "Frontlines" (with Nghtmre featuring GG Magree) [Deadbeats]
 "Blame" (with Diplo featuring Elliphant) [Deadbeats] 
 "Stardust" (featuring Twin Shadow) [Deadbeats]
 "Too Young" (featuring Rivers Cuomo and Pusha T) [Deadbeats]

2017
 "Where the Wild Things Are" (with Illenium) [Deadbeats]
 "Blood Brother" (with Diskord and Reija Lee) [Deadbeats]
 "Way with You" (with Omar Linx) [Jackie Boy]
 "Lights Go Down" (with Jauz) [Bite This and Deadbeats]

2018
 "Samurai" (with Ganja White Night) [Deadbeats and SubCarbon Records]
 "Kill Em" (featuring 1000Volts) [Deadbeats]
 "We Could Be Kings" (with Dnmo featuring Tzar) [Deadbeats]
 "Magnets" (with Snails featuring Akylla) [Deadbeats]

2019
 "Lift You Up" (with Delta Heavy) [Deadbeats and RAM Records]
 "Rescue" (with Dion Timmer featuring Delaney Jane) [Deadbeats]
 "Stars Tonight" (with Droeloe) [Deadbeats]
 "Shake" (with Jauz) [Bite This / Deadbeats]
 "Feel So" (with Funkin Matt featuring Fiora) [Spinnin' Records]
 "Sound of the Underground" (with Urbandawn) [Deadbeats]
 "Bumpy Teeth" (with Subtronics) [Deadbeats]

2020
 "Into the Abyss" (with Rezz) [Deadbeats]

2021
 "Late Night Drive" [Altered States]
 "Alive" (with Mkla) [Deadbeats]
 "No Prayers" (with Omar Linx) [Warner Music]

2022
 "Gassed Up" (with Subtronics featuring Flowdan) [Deadbeats and Cyclops Music]

Production credits

2014
 Omar Linx - "Dosey Doe" (produced by Pro Logic and Zeds Dead) [Jackie Boy]

Remixes
2009
 Barletta – "Panther"  (Zeds Dead Remix) 
 Radiohead – "Pyramid Song" (Zeds Dead Illuminati Remix)
 Fenech-Soler – "LA Love" (Zeds Dead Remix)

2010
 Massive Attack – "Paradise Circus" (Zeds Dead Remix) 
 Blue Foundation – "Eyes on Fire" (Zeds Dead Remix) 
 Sublime - "Doin Time" (Zeds Dead Summer Grime Remix) 
 The Rolling Stones – "Gimme Shelter" (Zeds Dead Remix) 
 Foo Fighters – "The Pretender" (Zeds Dead Ruckus Remix) 
 Dragonette – "Volcano" (Zeds Dead Remix)   
 Jeuce – "Kiss" (Zeds Dead Remix)

2011
 Jason Falkner – "Only You" (Zeds Dead Remix) 
 DJ Vadim and The Electric – "Toot Toot" (Zeds Dead Remix) 
 Blue Foundation – "Heads on Fire" (Zeds Dead Remix) 
 Sabi – "Wild Heart" (Zeds Dead Remix)

2012
 Totally Enormous Extinct Dinosaurs – "Household Goods" (Zeds Dead Remix) 
 Sebastien Tellier – "Divine" (Danger Remix) (Zeds Dead ReRemix)
 The Roots featuring Monsters of Folk – "Dear God 2.0"  (Zeds Dead Remix) 
 Colin Munroe featuring Pusha T- "The Fight of My Life" (Zeds Dead Remix) 
 Bon Iver – "Woods" (Zeds Dead Remix) 
 The Prodigy – "Breathe" (Zeds Dead Remix)

2013
 Marina and the Diamonds – "Lies" (Zeds Dead Remix) 
 Nina Simone – "Don't Let Me Be Misunderstood" (Zeds Dead Remix)

2014
 Son Lux – "Flickers" (Zeds Dead Remix) 
 Broken Bells – "Holding On For Life" (Zeds Dead Remix) 
 DJ Fresh featuring Ella Eyre - "Gravity" (Zeds Dead Remix) 
 Jack Ü featuring Kiesza – "Take Ü There" (Zeds Dead Remix)

2015
 Martin Solveig and GTA – "Intoxicated" (Zeds Dead Remix)
 Tazer and Tink – "Wet Dollars" (Zeds Dead Remix)

2016
 Omar Linx – "Red Light Green Light" (Zeds Dead Remix) 
 Zeds Dead – "Slow Down" (Zeds Dead Remix)

2018
 3LAU featuring Carly Paige – "Touch" (Zeds Dead Remix)
 Gorgon City with Kamille and Ghosted – "Go Deep" (Zeds Dead Remix)

2019
 Billie Eilish – "Bury a Friend" (Zeds Dead Remix)
 Ellie Goulding and Diplo featuring Swae Lee – "Close to Me" (Zeds Dead Remix)
 Oliver Tree – "Miracle Man" (Zeds Dead Remix)

2020
 Biicla – "Deeper" (Zeds Dead and Funkin Matt Remix)
 Atmosphere – "GodLovesUgly" (Zeds Dead and Subtronics Remix)
 Nessa Barrett – "I Hope Ur Miserable Until Ur Dead" (Zeds Dead Remix)

Awards

Much Music Video Awards

|-
| style="text-align:center;" rowspan="2"| 2015 || Lost You (featuring Twin Shadow and D'Angelo Lacy) || Best EDM/Dance Video || 
|-
|Lost You (featuring Twin Shadow and D'Angelo Lacy) || Best Post-Production || 
|-
| 2017 || "Too Young" (featuring Rivers Cuomo and Pusha T) || Fan Fave Video || 
|-

Juno Awards

|-
| style="text-align:center;" rowspan="2"| 2015 || Lost You featuring Twin Shadow and D'Angelo Lacy || Video Of The Year || 
|-
|Zeds Dead || Breakthrough Group Of The Year || 
|-
| style="text-align:center;"|2017 || Northern Lights || Dance Recording of the Year ||

Canadian Independent Music Awards

|-
| style="text-align:center;"|2017 || Zeds Dead || Electronic/Dance Artist/Group of the Year ||

References

External links
 Zeds Dead Coffee Breaks

Dubstep musicians
2009 establishments in Ontario
Canadian electronic music groups
Canadian musical duos
Dubstep music groups
Electronic dance music duos
Moombahcore musicians
Musical groups established in 2009
Musical groups from Toronto
Mad Decent artists